Erdem Olavi Raustila, until 1941 Ramstedt (10 December 1904 Lahti – ?) was a Finnish diplomat. He was employed by the Confederation of Finnish Wood Processing Industries in 1945–1959 and then moved to 1959 as a negotiating officer for the Ministry for Foreign Affairs. He was Ambassador to Belgrade and Athens 1961–1965, Budapest 1965–1969 and Athens.

His father was G. J. Ramstedt.

References 

Ambassadors of Finland to Yugoslavia
Ambassadors of Finland to Greece
Ambassadors of Finland to Hungary
People from Lahti
1904 births
Year of death missing